The 1956 Albanian National Championship was the nineteenth season of the Albanian National Championship, the top professional league for association football clubs, since its establishment in 1930.

Overview
It was contested by 9 teams, and Dinamo Tirana won the championship.

League standings

Results

References
Albania - List of final tables (RSSSF)

Kategoria Superiore seasons
1
Albania
Albania